Tony Lloyd (born 1950) is a British Labour Party politician.

Tony Lloyd may also refer to:

Tony Lloyd, Baron Lloyd of Berwick (born 1929), retired English judge
Tony Lloyd (artist), Australian contemporary painter
Tony Lloyd (tennis), British tennis player

See also
Anthony Lloyd (disambiguation)